Apple Developer (formerly Apple Developer Connection) is Apple Inc.'s website for software development tools, application programming interfaces (APIs), and technical resources. It contains resources to help software developers write software for the macOS, iOS, iPadOS, watchOS, and tvOS platforms. 

The applications are created in Xcode, or sometimes using other supported 3rd party programs. The apps can then be submitted to App Store Connect (formerly iTunes Connect), another one of Apple's website for approval the internal review team. Once approved, they can be distributed publicly via the respective app stores, i.e. App Store (iOS) for iOS and iPadOS apps, iMessage app store for Messages apps and Sticker pack apps, App Store (tvOS) for Apple TV apps, watchOS app store for Apple Watch apps with watchOS 6 and later, and via App Store (iOS) for earlier versions of watchOS. macOS apps are a notable exception to this, as they can be distributed similarly via Apple's Mac App Store or independently on the World Wide Web.

Programs

Mac 
The Mac developer program is a way for developers of Apple's macOS operating system to distribute their apps through the Mac App Store. It costs US$99/year. Unlike iOS, developers are not required to sign up for the program in order to distribute their applications. Mac applications can freely be distributed via the developer's website and/or any other method of distribution excluding the Mac App Store. The Mac Developer Program also provides developers with resources to help them distribute their Mac applications.

Software leaks
There have been several leaks of secret Apple software through the prerelease program, most notably the Mac OS X 10.4 Tiger leaks, in which Apple sued three men who allegedly obtained advance copies of Mac OS X 10.4 prerelease builds from the site and leaked it to BitTorrent.

Attempted hacks
On July 18, 2013, an intruder attempted to access sensitive personal information on Apple's developer servers. The information was encrypted, but Apple could not guarantee that some information about developers may have been accessed. The Developer website was taken down for "maintenance" that Thursday, and was said to be undergoing maintenance through Sunday, when Apple posted a notice on the site notifying users of the attempted hack. They have stated that they will be rebuilding their servers and the developer system to prevent this from happening in the future.

Developer tutorials and tools
Apple provides free tutorials and guide support for their developer program. There are many intuitive sites like MacDevelopers and GeeksforGeeks who provide free guides and resources for Apple Developers.

In the beginning of July, Apple finished construction on their Developer Center in Cupertino, California. During special events, developers are able to visit the center for one-on-one’s with Apple employees, demos of upcoming software, and more.

See also
 Apple ID

References

External links
Apple Developer website
GeeksforGeeks
MacDevelopers 

Apple Inc. services
Macintosh operating systems development
 
Software developer communities